Blacktown Hospital is district general  hospital in Blacktown, New South Wales, Australia, about 34 kilometres from the Sydney CBD. Together with Mount Druitt Hospital and associated community health centres, it is a part of the Western Sydney Local Health District (WSLHD).

Services
Blacktown Hospital provides a wide range of health services including:

 Ante-Natal/Gynaecology Unit
 Delivery Suite
 Post-Natal
 Special Care Nursery
 Acute Medical
 Coronary Care and Coronary Stepdown Unit
 Diabetes Center
 Acute Rehabilitation
 Acute Stroke Unit
 Pre-Admission Clinic
 Day Procedure Unit
 Orthopaedic
 Surgical
 Surgical/Medical Short Stay Unit
 Intensive Care Unit
 High Dependency
 Oncology Services
 Mental Health
 Regional Dialysis Centre
 Community Health Services including Dental

It operates a 24-hour emergency department and a full Intensive Care Unit and CCU. It also has 24-hour medical imaging and pathology services on site.

The hospital is a teaching hospital of the Western Sydney University's Blacktown–Mount Druitt Clinical School and University of Sydney's Western Clinical School. 

The hospital also includes Bungarribee House, a psychiatric unit that, along with Cumberland Hospital provides mental health services to Western Sydney. The hospital's sub–acute mental health care facility, called the Melaleuca Unit, opened in 2014.

History
In September 1956, a public meeting was held to discuss the need for a hospital in the town. Following petitions to the State Health Department for a facility, tenders were called for the £1.5 million hospital in July 1961. The foundation stone was laid on 19 May 1963.

The original Blacktown District Hospital building was completed in January 1965 and "commenced rendering its service to the public on the 28th April, 1965". It was officially opened on 28 April 1965 by then NSW Health Minister Billy Sheahan. This building has since been demolished, but was located on the site of the current Building C (Clinical Services Building, 2016).

The original district hospital building was considered unique for its innovative design which included "Spanish style courtyards", high tech catering equipment and the only "single-storey, double corridor hospital in the world". It had a capacity of 152 beds.

Nurses were given strict dress code instructions before the opening, including no eye make-up and wearing a distinct shade of lipstick. Matron Erella Macaulay was made the first director of nursing after opening the first nursing school in Blacktown in 1964. In its first year, nurses helped deliver 500 babies.

The first executive officers included J.G.S Moffat (first Chairman of the Board of Directors), Anthony P. Suleau (first Chief Executive Officer), and Erella F. Macaulay (Matron).

A modern kiosk, medical superintendent's quarters and resident medical officers' quarters were added in 1965.

A Volunteer Service was established in 1969 following a meeting of the Hospital Auxiliary. Volunteer roles originally included cleaning thermometers, filing patient records, cleaning slides in Pathology, rolling bandages, collecting X-rays, counting tablets in Pharmacy, feeding patients, feeding babies for adoption, writing letters for patients, folding nappies, attending to flowers, and washing patients' hair.

A four-bed cardiac care unit opened in 1971.

A new Maternity Wing opened in 1976. This building is currently the Regional Dialysis Centre/Admin Building.

The first purpose-built birthing centre in NSW opened at the hospital in 1991  for low-risk mums-to-be with three birth rooms, all with en-suite. Beds had "pretty bedspreads", vertical drapes and plenty of light, and were designed to feel like a bedroom at home. Mothers-to-be were encouraged to wear their own nightgowns and use their own baby clothes, and partners and families were welcome. The first baby born in the unit was a baby boy weighing 4.22 kilos, to mother Marilyn Lentern and husband Paul. Sisters Sarah, Miriam and Bethany waited in the new lounge with their grandparents until they were beckoned in to the room to see their new brother. The Lenterns were presented with a basket of flowers, a photograph album and a bottle of champagne to celebrate the first birth in the centre.

A new hospital building was completed in 1999 to meet growing healthcare demand. It was designed by McConel Smith & Johnson. This building currently houses the hospital's emergency department, some wards, clinics and operating theatres.

Expansion Project
In 2012, the NSW Government announced Blacktown & Mount Druitt Hospitals Expansion Project Stage 1. In the first stage of expansion, Blacktown Hospital projects included facilities for sub-acute mental health, more parking, infrastructure and service enhancements and a new clinical services building for cancer, cardiac, respiratory and aged care, with an extensive art and culture program. Stage 1 concluded with the opening of the new clinical services building in April 2016. The building was officially opened by the then Premier of NSW Mike Baird and then Minister for Health Jillian Skinner on Tuesday 17 May 2016.

To date the project has won 14 awards for design, consultation, arts and culture, and innovation, including three International Academy for Design & Health World Congress Academy Awards for Best International Hospital Project under 40,000 square metres, Best Interior Design and its arts projects.

Stage 2 of the project is currently underway to deliver a new acute services building, car park expansion and further refurbishment.

The car park extension was officially opened by the then Premier of NSW Gladys Berejiklian on 8 February 2018. The car park was the first hospital car park in NSW with a red/green light parking guidance system.  Construction of the acute services building commenced in 2017 and will be completed in 2019. The new acute services building will include facilities for emergency, operating theatres, intensive care, maternity, birthing, newborn health, and paediatrics. Further refurbishment of the existing 1999 hospital building will be completed in 2020 to provide expanded ambulatory care and other services.

References

Hospital buildings completed in 1965
Hospitals in Sydney
Teaching hospitals in Australia
Hospitals established in 1965
1965 establishments in Australia